Under the Copyright Term Extension Act, books published in 1927, films released in 1927, and other works published in 1927, entered the public domain in 2023. Unpublished works whose authors died in 1952 entered the public domain.

Films
Metropolis 
The Battle of the Century 
The Jazz Singer
Wings
London After Midnight
Sunrise: A Song of Two Humans
Napoléon
The Lodger: A Story of the London Fog (Alfred Hitchcock)
It

Literature
Allan and the Ice-gods by H. Rider Haggard
Death Comes for the Archbishop by Willa Cather
To the Lighthouse (Virginia Woolf)
Steppenwolf (Hermann Hesse)
The Bridge of San Luis Rey (Thornton Wilder) 
Show Boat (Oscar Hammerstein II and Jerome Kern)
The original versions of the first three books of The Hardy Boys
The last two short stories in the Canon of Sherlock Holmes (Arthur Conan Doyle)

Music
 The Best Things in Life Are Free by George Gard De Sylva, Lew Brown, and Ray Henderson; from the musical Good News
 Potato Head Blues & Gully Low Blues by Louis Armstrong
 Mississippi Mud by Harry Barris and James Cavanaugh
 Back Water Blues, Preaching the Blues, Foolish Man Blues by Bessie Smith
 Oedipus rex by Igor Stravinsky
 The New Moon by Sigmund Romberg and Oscar Hammerstein II

References

Public domain in the United States
Public domain